("the Little Green Train of Sardinia" in English) is a rail tourism service operated by  ARST  in the island of Sardinia, Italy.

History
Characterized by lengthy travel times and winding tracks in attractive landscapes, the narrow gauge railways of Sardinia have always attracted the attention of travellers.  As early as 1921, the British writer D. H. Lawrence, in his book, Sea and Sardinia, recounted his experiences while traveling along the Cagliari–Isili line:

After World War II, railway tourism slowly took shape on the island. The name chosen for it, Trenino Verde, was used for the first time in 1984, and alludes to the many features rich in vegetation encountered by the trains.

The funding was spent on the restoration of steam locomotives, vintage carriages, stations and sections of line.

On 10 May 1995, 14 years after its closure, the restored  was reopened to rail traffic, in the form of Trenino Verde services, thus becoming the first tourist-train-only line in Sardinia.

In 2010, with the integration of ARST Gestione FdS (the name assumed by the FdS in 2008) into the ARST, the latter company inherited responsibility for the management of Sardinia's narrow gauge railways, including those of the Trenino Verde.

Lines

Cagliari division



Sassari-Macomer division



These lines are used all year round for chartered trains, operating customised itineraries.  In summer, there is also a regularly scheduled service.

See also

History of rail transport in Italy
List of railway stations in Sardinia
Rail transport in Italy

References

Notes

Bibliography

External links
Trenino Verde – official site 
The Daily Telegraph: Sardinia: Entranced by the 10.23 to Tempio – description by Marc Zakian of a trip from Nulvi to Palau
The Guardian: Rattle and roll into old Sardinia – description by Gavin Bell of a trip from Arbatax to Mandas
The West Australian: Intimate trip like no other – description by Jim Gill of a trip from to Mandas to Arbatax and return

Passenger rail transport in Italy
Transport in Sardinia